Pietro Federici or Petrus Federici (1571–1613) was a Catholic prelate who served as Bishop of Vulturara e Montecorvino (1609–1613).

Biography
Petrus Federici was born in Florence, Italy in 1571. On 31 Aug 1609, he was appointed during the papacy of Pope Paul V as Bishop of Vulturara e Montecorvino. On 8 Sep 1609, he was consecrated bishop by Pompeio Arrigoni, Archbishop of Benevento. He served as Bishop of Vulturara e Montecorvino until his death in 1613.

References

External links and additional sources 
 (for Chronology of Bishops) 
 (for Chronology of Bishops) 

17th-century Italian Roman Catholic bishops
1571 births
1613 deaths
Bishops appointed by Pope Paul V